JerryC (born 31 August 1981), also known by his English name Jerry Chang, is a Taiwanese guitarist and composer. He is known for arranging and playing "Canon Rock", a rock arrangement of Johann Pachelbel's Canon in D. He began playing the guitar at the age of 17, and the piano before age 15. His style is influenced by classical music, neoclassical guitarists, as well as metal bands such as Helloween and Metallica and Japanese rock bands such as B'z and L'Arc-en-Ciel.

Canon Rock
His most famous work, "Canon Rock", was made popular only after South Korean guitarist Lim Jeong-hyun, also known as funtwo, performed a cover version in 2005. The song has garnered much media attention; both renditions have been featured on newspapers such as The New York Times, blogs, television shows and radios worldwide.

Chang was featured in the profiles section of the January 2007 issue of Guitar World magazine, along with a tab transcription of "Canon Rock" in the featured songs sections.

At the height of its popularity, "Canon Rock" was one of the top 10 downloaded guitar tabs on the Ultimate Guitar Archive, and was once one of the most viewed videos on YouTube. There are thousands of Canon Rock covers currently on YouTube.

Recording contract
Chang has signed a recording contract with Taiwanese label HIM International Music. Although no official announcement was made by HIM, the company began creating a website for Chang in 2007. In a letter to his listeners several months later, he publicly announced that he has indeed signed a contract and has been working with fellow musician Tank.

Canon Rock single
The Canon Rock single includes "Canon Rock", the "Canon Rock backing track", "Dear Mozart", and the "Dear Mozart backing track".

References

1981 births
Living people
Mandopop musicians
Taiwanese guitarists
Musicians from Taipei
Taiwanese Protestants
21st-century guitarists
C